Phabya is a large village in Kyain Seikgyi Township of Kawkareik District, Kayin State, south-eastern Myanmar. It lies on the Phabya Chaung.

References

External links
Maplandia World Gazetteer

Populated places in Kayin State